Xanəgah (also, Xanagah, Xanagəh, Khanagya, and Khanagyakh) is a village and municipality in the Quba Rayon of Azerbaijan.  It has a population of 606.

References 

Populated places in Quba District (Azerbaijan)